John from Cincinnati is an American drama television series, set against the surfing community of Imperial Beach, California. It aired on HBO from June 10 to August 12, 2007.

Overview
John from Cincinnati is the result of a collaborative effort between writer/producer David Milch and author Kem Nunn, whose novels have been termed "surf noir".  The program deals with a strange young man of mysterious origin and the effect he has on a dysfunctional family of professional surfers and their community.

The series includes surfing sequences by well-respected surfers such as Brock Little, Keala Kennelly, Dan Malloy, John-John Florence, Shane Beschen, and Herbie Fletcher.

The series' theme song is "Johnny Appleseed," performed by Joe Strummer and the Mescaleros. A diverse soundtrack includes "Tic" by Kava Kava and songs from TV on the Radio, Muse, Buddy Guy, Kasabian, and the Yardbirds.

Cast and characters

Ratings and cancellation
The pilot for the series was shown directly after the highly anticipated series finale of The Sopranos, but it failed to sustain an audience. The Sopranos received an audience of 11.9 million people according to Nielsen ratings, but John from Cincinnati held onto only 3.4 million viewers. Subsequent episodes initially lost viewers, but ratings began to see a slow increase, and by the final episode viewership had reached over 3 million, more than some episodes of Deadwood.

One day after the season finale aired, HBO canceled the show.

Episodes

Home media

References

External links
 
Exploring Life On The Border With David Milch - Article about David Milch and the filming of John from Cincinnati, in Imperial Beach's local newspaper
 

2000s American drama television series
2007 American television series debuts
2007 American television series endings
English-language television shows
HBO original programming
Surfing mass media
Television series created by David Milch
Television shows set in San Diego County, California
Imperial Beach, California